Managaz (Mänägäz) is a rural locality (a village) in Kalmiyarovsky Selsoviet, Tatyshlinsky District, Bashkortostan, Russia. The population was 44 as of 2010. There is 1 street.

Geography 
Managaz is located 20 km south of Verkhniye Tatyshly (the district's administrative centre) by road. Savkiyaz is the nearest rural locality.

References 

Rural localities in Tatyshlinsky District